Arichanna sinica is a moth of the family Geometridae. It is found in Taiwan, Bhutan and China.

The wingspan is 44–56 mm.

Subspecies
Arichanna sinica sinica
Arichanna sinica refracta Inoue, 1978 (Taiwan)

References

Moths described in 1933
Boarmiini
Moths of Asia
Moths of Taiwan